The 2014–15 Dayton Flyers women's basketball team will represent the University of Dayton during the 2014–15 college basketball season. Jim Jabir resumes the responsibility as head coach for a 12th consecutive season. The Flyers were members of the Atlantic 10 Conference and play their home games at the University of Dayton Arena. They finished the season 28–7, 14–2 in A-10 play to finish in second place. They advanced to the championship game of the A-10 women's tournament where they lost to George Washington. They received an at-large bid to the NCAA women's tournament where they defeated Iowa State in the first round, upset Kentucky in the second round and Louisville in the sweet sixteen before losing to Connecticut in the elite eight.

2014–15 media

Dayton Flyers Sports Network
The Dayton Flyers Sports Network will broadcast Flyers games off of their athletic website, DaytonFlyers.com, with Shane White on the call. Most home games will also be featured on the A-10 Digital Network. Select games will be televised.

Roster

Schedule

|-
!colspan=9 style="background:#C40023; color:#75B2DD;"| Exhibition

|-
!colspan=9 style="background:#C40023; color:#75B2DD;"| Non-conference regular season

|-
!colspan=9 style="background:#C40023; color:#75B2DD;"| Atlantic 10 regular season

|-
!colspan=9 style="background:#C40023; color:#75B2DD;"| Atlantic 10 Tournament

|-
!colspan=9 style="background:#C40023; color:#75B2DD;"| NCAA tournament

Rankings
2014–15 NCAA Division I women's basketball rankings

See also
 2014–15 Dayton Flyers men's basketball team

References

Dayton
Dayton Flyers women's basketball seasons
Dayton
2014 in sports in Ohio
2015 in sports in Ohio